Frances Esther Wolcott ( Metcalfe, formerly Bass) (May 19, 1851 – February 9, 1933) was an American socialite and author.

Early life
Fanny, as she was known, was born on May 19, 1851 at her father's house on Swan Street in Buffalo, New York. She was a daughter of James Harvey Metcalfe (1822–1879) and Erzelia Frances ( Stetson) Metcalfe (1832–1913). Among her siblings were James Stetson Metcalfe (a drama critic for Life Magazine and The Wall Street Journal who married Elizabeth Tyree), George Stetson Metcalfe, and Francis Tyler Metcalfe. Her father came to Buffalo from Bath, New York in 1855 and created a family fortune establishing the First National Bank and the Buffalo, New York and Philadelphia Railroad. He was also an early park commissioner and helped implement Frederick Law Olmsted's plan for the city's park system.

Her paternal great-grandfather was killed in the Tory army at the Battle of Bunker Hill and her grandfather, Thomas Metcalfe, was "taken by his mother to Virginia, where later he freed his Virginia-born slaves and trekked to Central New York".

Career
After her husband's health declined, he did not run for reelection to Congress and they moved to Colorado Springs, Colorado where he continued the practice of law became general counsel for the Denver and Rio Grande Railroad Company.

She lived all over the world and in 1932, shortly before death, had published by Minton, Balch and Company, Heritage of Years: Kaleidoscopic Memories, a "brilliant work of a sophisticate who looks back over 80 years and tells what she saw during that time." In the prologue to her memoir, she writes:

"The privileges of my life have been great, including the acquaintance of distinguished persons of three continents, audiences with Popes and Kings, intercourse with soldiers, artists, musicians and writes. Those who have attracted me most are those who have had great dreams and striven to make them reality."

Among her many friends and acquaintances were architect Stanford White (who with his firm, McKim, Mead & White built her mother's home in Buffalo), diplomat John Buchan, poet Helen Hunt Jackson, and author Richard Le Gallienne. At Hillcrest, her country estate, she hosted "Theodore Roosevelt, Alice Roosevelt Longworth, Mark Twain, Ethel Barrymore and Karl Bitter, a famous sculptor."

Personal life

In 1874, Fanny married U.S. Representative Lyman Kidder Bass (1836–1889) in Buffalo. He was a law partner of president Grover Cleveland and Wilson S. Bissell (later former Postmaster General). Before his death from consumption in 1889, they were the parents of one child:

 Lyman Metcalfe Bass (1876–1955), the U.S. Attorney for the Western District of New York who married Grace Holland, a daughter of Nelson Holland, in 1904.

After Bass' death in 1877, she married Edward O. Wolcott, the then youngest member of the U.S. Senate in 1890 and a direct descendant of Oliver Wolcott, signer of the United States Declaration of Independence. They were married by The Rev. Francis Lobdell at St. Paul's Cathedral in Buffalo. In Washington, they lived in a mansion on Connecticut Avenue, "in the immediate neighborhood of the British Ambassador, and in the very heart of the fashionable set." They later divorced in 1899. Senator Wolcott died in 1905 while on vacation in Europe. 

After the divorce, she bought Hillcrest, a 32-room mansion in Pavilion, New York in the Genesee Valley. Fanny died in New York on February 9, 1933. After a funeral service at her son's residence in Buffalo, she was buried at Forest Lawn Cemetery there.

References

External links
Heritage of Years: Kaleidoscopic Memories by Frances Metcalfe Wolcott (1932)

1851 births
1933 deaths
American women memoirists
20th-century American memoirists
People from Buffalo, New York
People from Genesee County, New York
Burials at Forest Lawn Cemetery (Buffalo)